Antonios Kriezis (1796–1865) was a captain of the Hellenic navy during the Greek War of Independence and a Prime Minister of Greece from 1849 to 1854.

Kriezis was born in Troezen in 1796 to an Arvanite family. Their first known ancestor was a prisoner in Venetian Crete who became involved in shipbuilding in Venetian navies and settled in Hydra in 1650. In July 1821, he took part in the Greek expedition to Samos, and in 1822 participated in the naval battle of Spetses. In 1825, he and Konstantinos Kanaris failed in their attempt to destroy the Egyptian navy inside the port of Alexandria. In 1828, Ioannis Kapodistrias placed him in command of a naval squadron.  The following year, he captured Vonitsa from the Ottomans. In 1836, under King Otto , he became Minister of Naval Affairs. He served as Prime Minister of Greece from 24 December 1849, until 28 May 1854. He was succeeded by Konstantinos Kanaris.

He died in Athens in 1865.

His older son, Dimitrios Kriezis, became a naval officer and served as the aide-de-camp to King George I of Greece and as Minister for Naval Affairs, while his younger son, Epameinondas Kriezis, also became a naval officer and politician.

Honours
Two ships of the Hellenic Navy have been named Kriezis in his honour.

References

External links

Biography of Antonios Kriezis 

1796 births
1865 deaths
19th-century prime ministers of Greece
Eastern Orthodox Christians from Greece
People from Troizinia-Methana
Hellenic Navy admirals
Greek revolutionaries
Ministers of Naval Affairs of Greece
Greek military leaders of the Greek War of Independence
Prime Ministers of Greece
Arvanites